Rise and Resurrection of the American Programmer is a book written by Edward Yourdon in 1996.  It is the sequel to Decline and Fall of the American Programmer.  In the original, written at the beginning of the '90s, Yourdon warned American programmers that their business was not sustainable against foreign competition.  By the middle of the decade Microsoft had released Windows 95, which marked a groundbreaking new direction for the operating system, the internet was beginning to rise as a serious consumer marketplace, and the Java software platform had made its first public release.

Due to such large changes in the state of the software industry, Yourdon reversed some of his original predictions.  Notably absent from the book is any significant consideration of the open source software movement, particularly the development of the Linux kernel and the GNU operating system, which would come to have increasing significance in the coming decade in shaping the software industry.  Both the internet, Microsoft's business strategy, and Java, which all feature significantly in Yourdon's thesis, would come to be heavily influenced by this phenomenon.

1996 non-fiction books
Software development books
Software quality
Software industry
Science and technology in the United States
Prentice Hall books